Nathalie Tauziat was the defending champion and was one of the four semifinalists.

There was no result for the event due to rain. The four semifinalists were Steffi Graf, Tauziat, Elena Likhovtseva and Yayuk Basuki.

Seeds
A champion seed is indicated in bold text while text in italics indicates the round in which that seed was eliminated. All sixteen seeds received a bye to the second round.

Qualifying

Draw

Finals

Top half

Section 1

Section 2

Bottom half

Section 3

Section 4

References
 1998 DFS Classic Draws
 ITF Tournament Page
 ITF singles results page

DFS Classic - Singles
Singles